The Bangladesh Women's National Cricket League is a women's domestic cricket competition that takes place in Bangladesh, with the first edition taking place in 2006–07. The competition is variously played using 50 or 20 over formats.

The tournament sees eight teams competing, each representing one of the eight administrative divisions of Bangladesh. The most successful side in the history of the tournament is Khulna Division, with five recorded title wins.

History
The tournament began in 2006–07, with eight teams competing in 50 over matches in two groups, followed by a semi-final and final. Results of this tournament are not recorded. The following season, 2008–09, saw a change in the teams competing, with six teams representing six administrative divisions of Bangladesh competing in a round-robin group. Khulna Division won the tournament, winning all five of their matches. This format was retained for the following season, 2009–10, with Khulna Division again winning all five of their matches to win the tournament.

In 2010–11, the tournament was played as a Twenty20 competition, with two rounds of group stages. Khulna Division once again won the tournament, beating Rajshahi Division in the final. The tournament reverted to a 50 over competition for following seasons, with Khulna Division again winning in 2011–12 before Rangpur Division, in their first season competing in the Women's National Cricket League, won the title in 2012–13. 2015 was again a Twenty20 competition, although results are unrecorded. The 2017 season saw the addition of an eighth team, Mymensingh Division, and saw Khulna Division claim their fifth title as the tournament was again competed as a 50 over competition. The tournament returned to being a Twenty20 format in 2017–18, and saw Sylhet Division claim their first title. In 2018–19 the competition took place with a 50 over format, although results are unrecorded. 

In 2021–22 the Women's Zonal One-Day Competition took place instead of the Women's National Cricket League, with four zonal teams competing in 50 over matches. The tournament returned for the 2022–23 season, taking place in August 2022 with a Twenty20 format. Sylhet Division won the 2022–23 tournament.

Teams

Results

See also
 National Cricket League

References

Bangladeshi domestic cricket competitions
Women's cricket competitions in Bangladesh
Recurring sporting events established in 2007
2007 establishments in Bangladesh
Limited overs cricket
Twenty20 cricket leagues